Designers Guild is an international home and lifestyle company with a flagship store and showrooms on Kings Road and Marylebone High Street in London, as well as offices in London, Paris, and Munich.

Designers Guild designs and wholesales furnishing fabric, wall coverings, upholstery and bed, and bath collections throughout Europe, and over 40 countries worldwide.

Designers Guild history
Tricia Guild founded Designers Guild in 1970. The company is jointly owned by Tricia Guild, founder and creative director, and her brother Simon Jeffreys, Chief Executive.

Development
Turnover has grown over the past 20 years from less than £3 million to over £50 million  selling to interior designers, department stores, retailers, and the hotel and contract market. The largest single market is the UK, with sales overseas being conducted through key Designers Guild showrooms and operating centres. There are Designers Guild showrooms in London, Paris, Munich, and New York,  with additional locations in over 60 showrooms across the world, including all of Europe, New York City, Los Angeles, Tokyo, and Sydney.

Designers Guild also has an online shop.

Collections
Designers Guild collections offer a range of luxury furnishing fabrics and wall coverings including Designers Guild Kids and ‘Essentials’; a library of plain fabrics, for both domestic and contract sectors. The range of products as well as furnishing fabrics and wall coverings includes furniture, bed and bath, “home fragrance”, and accessories.

In addition to the Designers Guild collections, the company designs and manufactures under license William Yeoward Fabrics and Paper, and is the European and Middle East distributor for Ralph Lauren Fabric and Wallpaper. In 2011, Designers Guild launched a further license for the luxury brand Christian Lacroix.

In September 2008, Designers Guild launched under license from the ‘Royal Collection’ a division of the Royal household, the Royal Collection Fabrics and Wallpapers. This collection was inspired by the interiors of Buckingham Palace and Windsor Castle, and by the official archive of art in the Royal Collection.

Awards
1996: Queen’s Award for Export Achievement.
2008: Microsoft award for Best Use of Technology.
2010: Best British Brand awarded by Elle Decoration UK

References

External links
 DesignersGuild.com

Design companies of the United Kingdom